São Gabriel da Cachoeira Airport , also called Uaupés Airport, is the airport serving São Gabriel da Cachoeira, Brazil.

Airlines and destinations

Accidents and incidents
6 March 1991: a TABA Embraer EMB 110 Bandeirante flying to Manaus was hijacked near São Gabriel da Cachoeira by 3 persons.

Access

See also

List of airports in Brazil

References

External links

Airports in Amazonas (Brazilian state)